Alicia Margarita Kirchner (born 18 July 1946) is an Argentine politician. She is the elder sister of the late former President Néstor Kirchner and served in his government as Minister of Social Development, a role which she held under President Cristina Fernández de Kirchner, her sister-in-law, until the end of her presidential term on 9 December 2015. On 10 December 2015, she was sworn in as the governor of the Province of Santa Cruz.

Biography 
Kirchner worked as a teacher and social worker, holding a PhD in social work. From 1975 to 1983 she served as a sub-secretary of social action in her native Santa Cruz Province. From 1987 to 1990 she was a minister in the municipality of Río Gallegos, leading on public health, education, culture, social action, recreation and sport. For a few months in 1990, and again between 1991 and 1995 she served as provincial minister for social affairs, under her brother who had been elected governor of Santa Cruz.

She resigned in 1995 to stand for Mayor of Río Gallegos but lost and worked in the Argentine Senate advising on education and family matters, returning to her ministerial position between 1997 and 2003.

In May 2003 Néstor Kirchner became president and appointed his sister to his cabinet in a similar position she had held under him at provincial level.

In December 2005, Kirchner was elected to the Argentine Senate as senator for Santa Cruz Province for the Front for Victory faction, replacing her sister-in-law Cristina Fernández de Kirchner who stood in Buenos Aires Province. From her senate seat in a few months she steered two important social development matters through the Senate and was widely seen as still holding great influence in the ministry.  However, in August 2006 she returned to her former position in the cabinet replacing Juan Carlos Nadalich, leaving her senate seat vacant during a leave of absence.

Kirchner was touted as a likely Front for Victory candidate to be governor of Santa Cruz in the 2007 elections, with fellow minister Julio de Vido as the other possible candidate mentioned.  President Kirchner's re-appointment of his sister to his cabinet was seen in some quarters as an initial show of support for her as candidate.   Ultimately, however, Kirchner remained a minister following the 2007 elections (and Daniel Peralta became governor of Santa Cruz).

In 2015, Kirchner ran as a FpV gubernatorial candidate again under the "Siempre Santa Cruz" slate with Pablo Gerardo González as running mate, winning the governorship with 51,797 votes, defeating the rival FpV slate "Santa Cruz Somos Todos" and other party candidates. Former president Cristina Fernandez de Kirchner and her son Máximo Kirchner flew from Buenos Aires on 10 December 2015, to attend Alicia Kirchner's swearing-in ceremony.

Alicia Kirchner also founded the National Liberation Current (KOLINA), a national political activist organization and political party, on 20 July 2010.

Governor of Santa Cruz

Cabinet

References

External links 
 KOLINA
 Senate profile, accessed 2006-08-24
 Ministry press release on re-appointment, accessed 2006-08-24

1946 births
Living people
People from Río Gallegos, Santa Cruz
Argentine people of Chilean descent
Argentine people of Croatian descent
Argentine people of Swiss-German descent
Women members of the Argentine Senate
Justicialist Party politicians
Kolina politicians
Members of the Argentine Senate for Santa Cruz
Ministers of social welfare of Argentina
Alicia
Governors of Santa Cruz Province, Argentina
Women governors of provinces of Argentina
Women government ministers of Argentina